Leih Sebtaha (Why Did You Leave Her') is the fifteenth full-length Arabic studio album from Egyptian pop singer Angham, launched in Egypt in 2001.

Track listing

 Sidi Wisalak (Your Charm) (Lyrics by: Ezzat elGendy | Music composed by: Sheriff Tagg | Music arrangements by: Tarek Akef)
 Leih Sebtaha (Why Did You Leave Her) (Lyrics by: Baha' elDeen Mohammad | Music composed by: Sheriff Tagg | Music arrangements by: Tarek Madkour)
 Rahet Layali (Nights Have Gone) (Lyrics by: Mohammad elRifai | Music composed by: Sheriff Tagg | Music arrangements by: Yahya elMougi)
 Magabsh Serty (Did He Mention Me) (Lyrics by: Ayman Bahgat Amar | Music composed by: Riyad elHamshari | Music arrangements by: Tarek Akef)
 Leih Sebtaha (instrumental) (Why Did You Leave Her) Lyrics by: Baha' elDeen Mohammad | Music composed by: Sheriff Tagg | Music arrangements by: Tarek Madkour)
 Tedhak Alaya (You Laugh At Me) (Lyrics by: Saoud elSharabtli | Music composed by: elFaissal | Music arrangements by: Mahmoud Sadek)
 Noujoum elLeil (Stars Of the Night) (Lyrics by: Wael Helal | Music composed by: Ameer Abdel Majeed | Music arrangements by: Ashraf Mahrous)
 Habbeitak Leih (Why Did I Even Love You) (Lyrics by: Nader Abdallah | Music composed by: Sheriff Tagg | Music arrangements by: Ashraf Mahrous)
 Hayran (Confused) (Lyrics by: Naser Rashwan | Music composed by: Ameer Abdel Majeed | Music arrangements by: Hisham Niyaz)
 Ana Indak (I'm At Your Place)''''' (Lyrics by: Bahaa elDeen Mohammad | Music composed by: Sheriff Tagg | Music arrangements by: Tarek Madkour)

References

Angham albums
Arabic-language albums
2001 albums
Alam elPhan Records albums